The Treaty of Torrellas (called a sentencia arbitral, "sentence by arbitration," in Castilian), signed in Zaragoza on 8 August 1304, settled the question of conquest of the Kingdom of Murcia, thitherto a dependency of the Crown of Castile, by James II of Aragon.

Between 1296 and 1300, James led a series of military operations in Murcia with the intention of conquering a large zone between Elda in the north and Huércal-Overa in the south.

James got together with Ferdinand IV of Castile in 1304 to fix new borders between their two states in Andalusia. Peace was effected between the two powers and the major part of Murcia was assigned to Castile. The cities of Cartagena, Orihuela, Elche, Caudete, Elda, and Alicante passed to the Kingdom of Valencia. The treaty, however, did not last, being replaced the next year by the Treaty of Elche.

See also
List of treaties

Torrellas
Torrellas
Torrellas
Torrellas
Treaties of the Crown of Aragon
14th century in Aragon
1304 in Europe
14th century in Castile